Scot Robison (born December 5, 1988) is an American former swimmer.

Robinson, a freestyle specialist from Charlotte, North Carolina, was a varsity swimmer for the Virginia Cavaliers. At the 2011 World Championships in Shanghai, Robison featured in the heats of the  team, which secured a bronze medal. In 2012 he was an alternate for the U.S. Olympic squad after placing seventh in the 100 m freestyle at the trials, where he had surprised with the fastest swim in the heats.

References

1988 births
Living people
American male freestyle swimmers
Swimmers from North Carolina
Sportspeople from Charlotte, North Carolina
Virginia Cavaliers men's swimmers
Medalists at the 2009 Summer Universiade
Universiade medalists in swimming
Universiade gold medalists for the United States
Universiade silver medalists for the United States
Swimmers at the 2011 Pan American Games
Medalists at the 2011 Pan American Games
Pan American Games medalists in swimming
Pan American Games gold medalists for the United States
Pan American Games silver medalists for the United States
World Aquatics Championships medalists in swimming